The men's tournament of the 2018 FIBA 3x3 Europe Cup hosted in Bucharest, Romania, was contested by 12 teams. Four-time 3x3 World Champions Serbia won its first ever European 3x3 championship after dethroning defending European 3x3 Champions, Latvia, 19–18 in the final.

Participating teams 
The hosts, Romania, qualified for the tournament automatically. The eleven other teams went in their respective qualifiers. FIBA announced the composition of the pools last 16 August 2018.

Main tournament

Preliminary round

Group A

Group B

Group C

Group D

Knockout stage 
All times are local.

Awards 

Team of the Tournament
 Dusan Bulut
 Kārlis Lasmanis
 Simon Finzgar

Final standings

References 

FIBA Europe 3x3 Championships